Scholz & Friends is one of Europe's largest advertising agencies. The company was founded in Hamburg by Jürgen Scholz, Uwe Lang and Michael Menzel in 1981. Today, the company has dual headquarters in Hamburg-HafenCity and Berlin-Mitte. Scholz & Friends started a joint venture with Commarco which was acquired by the WPP Group in 2011.

Well known designs
Paralympic symbol (2003)
Walk of Ideas (2006)

References

External links

Advertising agencies of Germany
Marketing companies established in 1981
German companies established in 1981
Companies based in Hamburg
Companies based in Berlin